An excursion is a brief recreational trip.

Excursion may also refer to:

Science and technology 
 Brownian excursion, a concept in the theory of stochastic processes
 Critical excursion, or criticality accident, a topic in nuclear physics
 Diaphragmatic excursion, the movement of the thoracic diaphragm during breathing
 Geomagnetic excursion, a change in the Earth's magnetic field
 Excursion (audio), the linear movement range of a speaker
 eXcursion, a Digital Equipment Corporation Pathworks X11 server for Windows

Arts and entertainment

Music 
 Excursion (album) a 1993 album by Ray Drummond
 Excursions (Eddie Harris album), 1973
Excursions (Paul Murphy and Larry Willis album), 2008
 Excursions: Remixes & Rare Grooves, a 1995 album by the Brand New Heavies
 Excursions, a 2018 album by C418
 Excursions (Barber), a 1942 solo piano piece by Samuel Barber
 "Excursions", a 1991 song by A Tribe Called Quest from The Low End Theory

Other media 
 The Excursion, an 1814 poem by William Wordsworth
 Excursions (anthology), an anthology of essays by Henry David Thoreau
 Excursions (film), a 2016 American film

Other 
 Ford Excursion, an SUV
 Grand Excursion, an 1854 American train journey, retraced in 2004
 Harvest excursion, a former agricultural practice in Canada
 Runway excursion, the unplanned exit of an aircraft from a runway